Anicet may refer to:

People with the forename
Anicet Abel (born 1990), Malagasy football player
Anicet Adjamossi (born 1984), Beninese football player
Anicet Brodavski (born 1944), Lithuanian politician
Anicet-Georges Dologuélé (born 1957), Central African politician
Anicet Eyenga (born 1986), Cameroonian football player
Anicet Kopliński (1875–1941), Polish friar
Anicet Lavodrama (born 1963), Central African basketball player
Anicet Le Pors (born 1931), French politician
Anicet Charles Gabriel Lemonnier (1743–1824), French painter
Anicet Rasoanaivo (born 1969), Malagasy boxer
Anicet Turinay (born 1945), French politician

People with the surname
Oussou Konan Anicet (born 1989), Ivorian football player
Pascal Anicet (born 1983), Nigerian football player
Auguste Anicet-Bourgeois (1806-1871), French playwright

Location
Saint-Anicet, municipality in Canada

See also 
 Anicetus (disambiguation), Latin form the name

French masculine given names
Polish masculine given names